Smythe, an uncommon spelling of the surname Smith, may refer to:

People
Conn Smythe (1895–1980), Canadian businessman, soldier and sportsman in ice hockey and horse racing
Dallas Smythe (1907–1992), Canadian political activist and researcher
Danny Smythe (1948–2016), American drummer, member of the rock band The Box Tops
Douglas Smythe, American visual effects artist, see Academy Award for Best Visual Effects
Durham Smythe (born 1995), American football player
Faye Smythe (born 1985), New Zealand actress
Frank Smythe (1900–1949), British mountaineer, author, photographer, and botanist
George Smythe, 7th Viscount Strangford (1818–1857), British politician
James Moore Smythe (1702–1734), English playwright and fop
John Smythe (disambiguation) several persons of this name
Pat Smythe (pianist) (1923–1983), Scottish jazz pianist
Pat Smythe (1928–1996), British show jumper
Percy Smythe, 6th Viscount Strangford (1780–1855), British diplomat
Percy Smythe, 8th Viscount Strangford (1826–1869), British man of letters
Peter Smythe (disambiguation) several persons of this name
Philip Smythe, 2nd Viscount Strangford (1634–1708), English politician 
Quentin Smythe (1916–1997), South African World War II recipient of the Victoria Cross
Reg Smythe (1917–1998), British cartoonist
Stafford Smythe (1921–1971), Canadian ice hockey player and manager
Thomas Smythe (c.1558–1625), English merchant and politician
Thomas Smythe, 1st Viscount Strangford (1599–1635)
William Smythe (disambiguation) several persons of this name

Fictional characters
Alan Smythe, character in British TV series Monarch of the Glen
Alistair Smythe, Spider-Man villain
Coran Heironymus Wimbledon Smythe, Voltron: Legendary Defender character
Evelyn Smythe, Doctor Who character
Greenlee Smythe in American TV soap opera All My Children
Mary Greenlee Smythe, her mother
Ira Smythe, mercenary in video game Jagged Alliance 2
Jane Smythe, X-Men villain
President-for-Life Smythe of Null Island
Reginald Ponsonby-Smythe in video game Destroy All Humans! 2
Samantha Smythe in American comic book series That Wilkin Boy
Samson Smythe in That Wilkin Boy
Sheila Smythe in That Wilkin Boy
Sebastian Smythe in American musical comedy-drama TV series Glee
Spencer Smythe, Spider-Man villain
Sylvester P. Smythe, mascot of American humor magazine Cracked

Other uses
Smythe, Indiana, an unincorporated community
Mount Smythe, Jasper National Park, Canada
Rockcliffe-Smythe, Toronto, Canada
Smythe's Megalith, lost Neolithic tomb in Kent, England
Smythe Baronets
Smythe Division of the National Hockey League

See also
Smith (disambiguation)
Smith (surname)
Smyth (surname)

English-language surnames
Occupational surnames
English-language occupational surnames